The Aero Ae 50 was a prototype propeller-driven military reconnaissance aircraft built in Czechoslovakia.

Designed with the artillery spotting role in mind, the Ae 50 was a high-wing monoplane of unusual design, with a fuselage that terminated abruptly immediately aft of the crew cabin, leaving the tailplane to be mounted on a single boom attached to the wing. The tailwheel was mounted at the rear of the fuselage. This arrangement had been intended to maximise the observer's field of view. Another unusual feature was that it incorporated a towing point to allow it to be towed by another, longer-range aircraft to enable it to be transported to a combat zone outside of its own range without having to stop and refuel.

The Ae 50 was found to have a range of flaws, including directional stability and the operation of the leading-edge slots. These problems were overcome, but the problem of the aircraft being somewhat overweight proved insoluble, and Aero abandoned development of the aircraft.

Specifications (Ae 50)

See also

References 

1940s Czechoslovakian military reconnaissance aircraft
High-wing aircraft
Aero Vodochody aircraft
Aircraft first flown in 1949